Pierre Lacroix (23 January 1935 – 28 March 2019) was a French rugby union player who played at scrum-half for the France national team.

He played most of his player career for SU Agen, from 1959/60 to 1970/71. He won three times the French Championship, in 1961/62, 1964/65 and 1965/66.

On 9 March 1958, Lacroix made his debut for France in a 19–0 victory over Australia during their 1957–58 tour of Britain, Ireland and France. Lacroix scored his first try for France on 26 March 1960 in a 16–8 victory over Wales during the 1960 Five Nations Championship. Lacroix made his final appearance for France on 23 March 1963 in a 5–3 victory over Wales during the 1963 Five Nations Championship. Over the course of his international career, Lacroix earned 27 caps for France and scored 4 tries (for a total of 12 points). In his final nine appearances for France, Lacroix served as the team's captain.

References

1935 births
2019 deaths
French rugby union players
France international rugby union players
Rugby union scrum-halves